Jason S. Lewis is a British radiochemist whose work relates to oncologic therapy and diagnosis. His research focus is a molecular imaging-based program focused on radiopharmaceutical development as well as the study of multimodality (PET, CT & MRI) small- and biomolecule-based agents and their clinical translation. He has worked on the development of small molecules as well as radiolabeled peptides and antibodies probing the overexpression of receptors and antigens on tumors.

Education

Jason S. Lewis was born and raised in Horndean, Hampshire, England. Lewis received his Bachelor of Science in chemistry, B.Sc. from the University of Essex in 1992. He received his Master of Science in chemistry from the University of Essex in 1993.

In 1996, he received his Doctor of Philosophy in Biochemistry at the University of Kent.

Career
Lewis was an instructor of Radiology at the Washington University School of Medicine, Mallinckrodt Institute of Radiology from 2000 to 2002. From 2003 to 2008, he was an assistant professor of radiology at the Washington University School of Medicine, Mallinckrodt Institute of Radiology. He is the Emily Tow Jackson Chair in Oncology, the Vice Chairman for Research (Radiology) and Chief Attending of the Radiochemistry and Imaging Sciences Service at Memorial Sloan Kettering Cancer Center. He also heads a laboratory in the Sloan Kettering Institute's Molecular Pharmacology Program and is a professor at the Gerstner Sloan Kettering Graduate School of Biomedical Sciences.

Lewis holds joint appointments in the Departments of Radiology and the Department of Pharmacology at Weill Cornell Medical School, NY.

Research focus 
Lewis is a proponent of development imaging tools for use in personalized medicine. Lewis designs and develops radiochemical probes for use in nuclear medicine as well as multi-modality molecular imaging. The use of these probes span from oncological metabolic detection to understanding the biological processes of cancer and pharmacological modification. These probes can be used for biomarkers in clinical trials as well as used as an agent for oncological diagnostics. He has developed multiple new small molecules that target tumor metabolism, as well as radiolabeled peptides and antibodies for use in probing overexpression of receptors and antigens on tumors for research, clinical trials and in the clinic.

Recognition 
2014 Distinguished Investigator Award from the Academy of Radiology Research 
Fellow, World Molecular Imaging Society (FWMIS)                                                   
 2017 Michael J. Welch Award, Society of Nuclear Medicine and Molecular Imaging (SNMMI)                       
 2019 Paul C. Aebersold Award, Educational and Research Fund for Nuclear Medicine and Molecular Imaging (ERF) & Society of Nuclear Medicine and Molecular Imaging
 2019 Fellow, Society of Nuclear Medicine and Molecular Imaging (FSNMMI)

Editorial board memberships 
 Molecular Imaging and Biology (Editor-in-Chief)
 Journal of Nuclear Medicine (Associate Editor)
 ACS Bioconjugate Chemistry (Editorial Advisory Board)
 Nuclear Medicine and Biology (Associate Editor-in-Chief)

References 

1970 births
Alumni of the University of Kent
Alumni of the University of Essex
Living people
Radiochemistry